Alice Montacute (1407before 9 December 1462) was an English noblewoman and the suo jure 5th Countess of Salisbury, 6th Baroness Monthermer, and 7th and 4th Baroness Montagu, having succeeded to the titles in 1428.

Her husband, Richard Neville, became 5th Earl of Salisbury by right of his marriage to Alice.

Marriage and children 
Alice was born in 1407, the daughter and only legitimate child, of Thomas Montagu, 4th Earl of Salisbury, and Eleanor Holland, who was the daughter of Thomas Holland, 2nd Earl of Kent, and Lady Alice FitzAlan. The latter was a daughter of Richard FitzAlan, 3rd Earl of Arundel, and Eleanor of Lancaster.

In 1420, she married Richard Neville, who became the 5th Earl of Salisbury by right of his wife on the death of her father Thomas Montagu in 1428. Alice was thereafter styled as Countess of Salisbury.

The principal seat of the family was at Bisham Manor in Berkshire although their lands lay chiefly around Christchurch in Hampshire and Wiltshire.

She died sometime before 9 December 1462 and was buried in the Montagu Mausoleum at Bisham Abbey.

Alice and Richard had ten children who survived infancy:
 Lady Joan Neville (c. 1424–1462), who married William FitzAlan, 9th Earl of Arundel.
 Lady Cecily Neville (c. 1425–1450), who married Henry de Beauchamp, 1st Duke of Warwick.
 Richard Neville, 16th Earl of Warwick (1428–1471), who married the heiress Anne Beauchamp, suo jure 16th Countess of Warwick. They were parents to queen consort Anne Neville.
 Thomas Neville (c. 1429–1460), who was knighted in 1449 and died at the Battle of Wakefield.
 Lady Alice Neville (c. 1430–after 1503), who married Henry FitzHugh, 5th Baron FitzHugh. Their daughter, Elizabeth, married William Parr, 1st Baron Parr of Kendal. The two were grandparents to Queen consort Catherine Parr, the sixth wife of King Henry VIII.
 John Neville, 1st Marquess of Montagu (c. 1431–1471).
 George Neville (c. 1432–1476), who became Archbishop of York and Chancellor of England.
 Lady Eleanor Neville (c. 1438–before 1472), who married Thomas Stanley, 1st Earl of Derby.
 Lady Katherine Neville (c. 1442–1503/04), who married firstly William Bonville, 6th Baron of Harington, and secondly William Hastings, 1st Baron Hastings. By her first husband, she was the mother of Cecily Bonville.
 Lady Margaret Neville (c. 1444–1506), who married John de Vere, 13th Earl of Oxford.

Ancestry

References

1407 births
1462 deaths
Neville
English countesses
Alice
Burials at Bisham Abbey
15th-century English women
15th-century English nobility
Barons Monthermer
Barons Montagu
Wives of knights